The Surf Line is a railroad line that runs from San Diego north to Orange County along California's Pacific Coast. The tracks are now owned by the Southern California Regional Rail Authority and the North County Transit District, and hosts Metrolink's Orange County Line and Inland Empire–Orange County Line, the San Diego Coaster, and Amtrak Pacific Surfliner passenger trains. The BNSF Railway operates freight over the line using trackage rights.

History

Construction of the Surf Line between Los Angeles and San Diego began on October 12, 1880, with the organization of the California Southern Railroad Company. On January 2, 1882, the California Southern commenced passenger and freight service between National City and Fallbrook Junction, just north of Oceanside. From Oceanside the line turned northeast for a winding route through the Temecula Canyon, and was finished on August 21, 1882.

The line became part of the Atchison, Topeka and Santa Fe Railroad's transcontinental rail line in 1885 via an extension of the California Southern from Colton north over the Cajon Pass to Barstow. From 1886 to 1888, the Riverside, Santa Ana and Los Angeles Railway built a branch from Highgrove southwest via Riverside to Santa Ana and from Orange (just north of Santa Ana) northwest to Los Angeles. Also in 1888 the San Bernardino and San Diego Railway completed its line from Oceanside north to Santa Ana, completing what was originally called the Los Angeles–San Diego Short Line. The now-downgraded old route was destroyed by floods in 1891 and the new line, later named the Surf Line, was now the only line to San Diego from the north.

In 1910, the Fullerton and Richfield Railway built a short cutoff of the San Bernardino–Los Angeles route from Atwood west to Fullerton, giving the Surf Line its northern terminus of Fullerton. 

For much of the 20th century, the Surf Line (officially, the Fourth District of the Los Angeles Division) was to the Santa Fe what the New York City–Philadelphia corridor was to the Pennsylvania Railroad. Daily traffic could reach a density of ten trains (each way) during the summer months. The route hosted AT&SF San Diegan passenger trains, renamed the Pacific Surfliner by Amtrak in 2000. The Santa Fe installed centralized traffic control in 1943–1944 which increased capacity on the line.

Santa Fe sold the line to local transportation authorities in 1992, with ownership split between the Southern California Regional Rail Authority in Orange County and the San Diego Northern Railway in San Diego County.

Operations

Commuter trains began operating in the 1990s, initially as an outgrowth of existing Amtrak services before assuming the identities of Metrolink and Coaster. Coaster runs within San Diego County, between San Diego and Oceanside, while Metrolink's services operate north of Oceanside. Amtrak's Pacific Surfliner travels throughout the corridor. The San Diego Trolley light rail shares the Surf Line's right of way in San Diego, running adjacent to the heavy rail tracks. For about a mile in Oceanside, the Sprinter service parallels the Surf Line before heading east on the Escondido Subdivision towards Escondido, California.

Freight traffic includes military vehicles and equipment to Camp Pendleton and the Navy ports in San Diego. Due to passenger trains running on a daily schedule, occasional BNSF manifest freight trains run through the Surf Line often at night, which is dubbed as the "Daygo". 

About two-thirds of the  segment from the Orange County line to the Santa Fe Depot in downtown San Diego has been double-tracked.  As one of the nation's busiest corridors, local transportation and planning agencies want to complete the entire section. A  section of double track between Elvira (SR 52) and Morena (Balboa Avenue) was completed in July 2020. The $192 million project, which began in August 2015, completed  of double track from San Diego northward.

The segment of the LOSSAN Corridor within San Diego County achieved full implementation of positive train control in December of 2018, for all passenger and freight trains operating on this segment.

Track issues 

Due to its location along the beaches of Southern California, the line faces persistent issues due to sea level rise and coastal erosion, exacerbated by climate change. Coastal erosion eats away at the bluff each year and the rate has accelerated due to sea level rise due to climate change. The bluff has had to be shored up to safely run current operations. Steel beams were driven into the beach at the base of the bluff in September 2020 to stabilize the face of the bluff for 20 or 30 years.

In August, the California Coastal Commission had emphasized the need to move the railroad tracks inland as they reviewed the emergency permits for the stabilization work. The San Diego Association of Governments(SANDAG) is conducting a $3 million study on relocating the rail line. A tunnel under Del Mar, which would cost more than $3 billion, is being considered. In 2022, $300 million was included in the state budget for the SANDAG so that the project can compete for federal matching funds. Local leaders, including SANDAG’s executive director, showed Secretary of Transportation Pete Buttigieg the coastal erosion at the bluffs in October 2022.

A segment along the San Clemente coast on a low-lying section of track crosses an ancient, recurring landslide. Aggravated by storms and high tides, waves sometimes crash across these rails at high tide that are close to the ocean. On September 15, 2021, waves crashing over the rails damaged the tracks. The segment had to be shut down through October 3. The segment was closed to passenger traffic on September 29, 2022 due to soil movement; freight traffic continued at lowered speed. Additional rock was added after each incident. The passenger rail traffic stop continued into November as  anchors were being placed into bedrock. The Orange County Transportation Authority (OCTA), which owns the section of track, expects the route to be shut through early February 2023. OCTA officials said $7 million is needed to study realignment and other possible solutions to protect  of the line along the shore.

Historic station stops

These are not all the stations that currently operate. Many of these stations no longer exist (i.e. Linda Vista) and new ones have opened (i.e. Sorrento Valley). For a list of stations that currently operate, see the articles for Metrolink's Orange County Line  and the Coaster or the templates to the right.

 Santa Fe Los Angeles Division — Fourth District
 Los Angeles Union Passenger Terminal
 Santa Fe Springs
 Fullerton
 Anaheim
 Orange
 Santa Ana
 Irvine
 San Juan Capistrano
 San Clemente
 Oceanside
 Carlsbad
 Encinitas
 Del Mar
 Linda Vista
 Union Station (San Diego)

See also
 The Coast Line, continuing north from Los Angeles to San Francisco. It is owned by the SCRRA between Los Angeles and Moorpark, and Union Pacific from Moorpark onwards.
 History of rail transportation in California
 North Coast Corridor

Notes

References

External links
 Photos of Amtrak, Metrolink, and BNSF on the Surf Line
 California Southern Railway History

Amtrak
Rail lines in California
Public transportation in Southern California
Atchison, Topeka and Santa Fe Railway
Atchison, Topeka and Santa Fe Railway lines 
Amtrak lines